Belmore Park is a public park at the southern end of the Sydney central business district in the Australian state of New South Wales. Adjacent to the Central railway station, the park is bounded by Hay Street, Eddy Avenue, Elizabeth Street and Pitt Street. The area was previously known as Police Paddock and was part of a section of Crown land which included the Police Barracks, Devonshire Street Cemetery, Female Refuge of the Good Samaritan, Benevolent Asylum and a common.

History 
The area was landscaped and in 1868 it opened as a park dedicated to Somerset Lowry-Corry, 4th Earl Belmore the then Governor of New South Wales. In 1901 the whole area was resumed for the construction of Sydney's Central railway station with the majority of excavated earth placed on the common, burying the original layout. During the 1908–09 Royal Commission for the Improvement of the City of Sydney and Its Suburbs major landscaping works for the area were proposed by commissioner Norman Selfe.

Due to its proximity to the city, and especially to Central station, the park has long been a place for groups to gather—for protests, markets, events or performances. For example, in 1878 in front of a large crowd, Henri L'Estrange unsuccessfully tried twice to launch himself in a gas balloon, while during the 2000 Summer Olympics the park became one of five "live sites" where the games were publicly broadcast. In the late 1860s "Belmore Produce Markets" and Paddy's Markets were built in the area opposite the current park—now known as Haymarket.

The park is a key public transport hub. The final section of above-ground railway track forms the eastern edge of the park before going underground as the City Circle. Transdev John Holland buses in the direction of the Eastern Suburbs including express buses to the University of New South Wales depart from Eddy Avenue along which the CBD and South East Light Rail now runs. The western edge of the park is defined by a roadway ramp to the concourse level of the railway station. The terminus loop of the Inner West Light Rail line forms a ring around the entire park using ramps on both eastern and western edges to access the train station concourse.

Gallery

See also

 List of parks in Sydney
 Central railway station, Sydney

References

External links

 Parks History – Belmore Park, by the City of Sydney.
 Maps, forms and documents relating to Belmore Park, by the City of Sydney.
 Virtual tour of Belmore park at Panedia.com
 Catalogue reference in the Dictionary of Sydney

Parks in Sydney
1868 establishments in Australia
Sydney central business district
Parks established in 1868